Slumberin' on the Cumberland is an album by American musician John Hartford, released in 1979 (see 1979 in music).

Track listing
"Slumberin' on the Cumberland" (Hartford-Benny Martin)
"Greenback Dollar/Careless Love" (Traditional)
"Love in Vain" (Robert Johnson)
"If I Can Stay Away Long Enough" (Martin)
"Hillman (Martin)
"Southern Moon" (Alton Delmore)
"I Can Read Between the Lines in Your Letters" (Martin)
"Blue Writin' on White Paper (Martin)
"First Fall of Snow" (Pat Burton)
"Fiddle Faddle" (Burton)
"Go Fall Asleep Now" (Hartford)

Personnel
John Hartford – banjo, guitar, fiddle, plywood, vocals
Pat Burton – guitar, vocals
Benny Martin – fiddle, ukulele, vocals
Buddy Emmons - steel guitar, dobro
Sam Bush - mandolin
Roy Huskey, Jr. - double bass
Henry Strzelecki - electric bass
Hargus "Pig" Robbins - piano
Larrie Londin - drums

Production
Michael Melford - producer
Richard Adler - recording engineer

References

John Hartford albums
1979 albums